Henry Francis Briggs (1871–1913) was an English footballer who played in the Football League for Darwen and Everton.

References

1871 births
1913 deaths
English footballers
Association football goalkeepers
English Football League players
Mansfield Town F.C. players
Darwen F.C. players
Everton F.C. players
Nelson F.C. players